Kevin Candellori (born 7 July 1996) is an Italian professional footballer who plays as a midfielder for  club Fidelis Andria.

Career
Born in Ascoli Piceno, Candellori started his career in Ascoli youth sector. As a senior, he joined to Eccellenza club SSD Porto D'Ascoli.

In December 2015, he moved to Sambenedettese. With the club, he won the promotion in 2015–16 Serie D. Candellori made his professional debut on 10 September 2016 against Mantova. After three years in the club, he returned to Serie D and joined to Notaresco.

On 10 July 2019, he moved to Serie D club Campobasso.

On 27 August 2022, Candellori signed with Fidelis Andria.

References

External links
 
 

1996 births
Living people
Sportspeople from the Province of Ascoli Piceno
Footballers from Marche
Italian footballers
Association football midfielders
Serie C players
Serie D players
Eccellenza players
Ascoli Calcio 1898 F.C. players
A.S. Sambenedettese players
S.S.D. Città di Campobasso players
S.S. Fidelis Andria 1928 players